The Athens Banner-Herald is a daily newspaper with less than 20,000 circulation located in Athens, Georgia, USA, and owned by Gannett. The paper has a Sunday special and publishes online under the name Online Athens. It has been through a series of restructurings and mergers since 2000, culminating in its sale, along with several other papers, by Morris Communications to Gatehouse Media in August 2017. Since the merger of GateHouse Media and Gannett in November 2019, The Athens Banner-Herald is now owned by Gannett.

History
The newspaper traces its history to the Southern Banner''' newspaper which began publishing on March 20, 1832. The paper's masthead and owners were unchanged until 1872, when it was sold and the masthead changed to North-East Georgian and to Athens Weekly Georgian after sale, before returning to its original masthead in 1879. The title changed again with its merger with its rival the Southern Watchman to form the Athens Banner-Watchman in 1882. It was owned and operated by T.L. Gantt. In 1889, the masthead became the Athens Weekly Banner for the weekly edition. This later became The Weekly Banner until the cessation of weekly editions in 1921.

In 1902, the daily newspaper, then called the Athens Daily Banner, became the Athens Banner under the ownership of H.J. Rowe. It continued under this title until 1923 when it merged with the Athens Daily Herald to become the Banner-Herald. This became the Athens Banner-Herald in 1933. Earl Braswell was the newspaper's publisher, a position he held until 1965.

In 1965, Billy and Charles Morris of Morris Communications purchased the newspaper. On June 17 that year, the weekly Athens Advertiser changed its name to the Athens Daily News and became a seven-day morning paper to compete with the afternoon Athens Banner-Herald. On June 17, 1965, the weekly Athens Advertiser changed its name to the Athens Daily News and became a seven-day morning paper, competing with the afternoon Athens Banner-Herald. Glenn Vaughn wrote in its first editorial page, "Our goal is to produce a daily newspaper that will be equal to this magnificent community." The Athens Daily News was independent, and is where Lewis Grizzard began his career as a sports writer. On December 24, 1967, the Morris family, which owned the Athens Banner-Herald, bought the Athens Daily News and continued publishing both papers, though eventually both editorial staffs were merged.

In 1991, the News and Banner-Herald moved into a new office at the corner of Thomas and Broad Streets. The building came to be known as The News Building. During this time, the Athens Banner-Herald established a web presence. In 1996, the newspapers started a web page, Athenaeum. The following year, the newspaper started OnlineAthens.com, its current web page. In 2001, the News and Banner-Herald merged into a single morning paper with the Banner-Herald'' name. In December 2011, Morris Communications reached an agreement to sell The News Building to Lulscal, LLC.

Awards
The newspaper routinely wins awards in Georgia Press Association and Georgia Associated Press competitions, including Story of the Year honors in 2002, 2004 and 2006.

References

External links
 

Newspapers published in Georgia (U.S. state)
Companies based in Athens, Georgia
Clarke County, Georgia
Gannett publications